Alfred Gould may refer to:
 Alfred Gould (trade unionist)
 Alfred Gould (surgeon)